Lee Bom is a South Korean actress. She is known for her roles in dramas such as The Game: Towards Zero, Hello Monster, Juvenile Justice, Girls' Generation 1979 and Link: Eat, Love, Kill. She also appeared in movies Spring Bears Love, The Beauty Inside, After My Death, Mourning Grave and Time Renegades.

Filmography

Television series

Film

Music video appearances

References

External links 
 
 

1993 births
Living people
21st-century South Korean actresses
South Korean television actresses
South Korean film actresses